The Abipón language was a native American language of the Guaicuruan group of the Guaycurú-Charruan family that was at one time spoken in Argentina by the Abipón people.  Its last speaker is thought to have died in the 19th century.

Phonology

Consonants

Vowels

Bibliography
Cited in the Catholic Encyclopedia
 Hervas (1785), Origine, Formazione, Mecanismo, ed Armonia degli Idiomi (Cesena)
 Hervas (1787), Vocabulario poliglotto
 Hervas (1787), Saggio practico delle Lingue ...
 Adrian Balbi (1826), Atlas ethnographique du globe (Paris)
 Alcide d'Orbigny (1839), L'Homme americain (Paris)
 Daniel Brinton, The American Race.
 UPSID

References

External links

Abipón basic lexicon at the Global Lexicostatistical Database
 World Atlas of Language Structures information on Abipón

Languages of Argentina
Guaicuruan languages
Extinct languages of South America
Languages extinct in the 19th century
Chaco linguistic area

hu:Abipónok